Baqi (also Romanized as Baqī‘ and Baqī; also known as Baghī, Boghī, and Baqīḩ) is a village in Safaiyeh Rural District, in the Central District of Zaveh County, Razavi Khorasan Province, Iran. At the 2006 census, its population was 136, in 36 families.

See also 

 List of cities, towns and villages in Razavi Khorasan Province

References 

Populated places in Zaveh County